Akyamaç is a village in the Siirt District of Siirt Province in Turkey. The village is populated by Arabs and had a population of 151 in 2021.

References 

Villages in Siirt District
Arab settlements in Siirt Province